The Turtle is the name of two supervillains appearing in comic books published by DC Comics, who were primarily enemies of the Flash.

Two versions of the Turtle made their live action debut on The Flash, portrayed by Aaron Douglas and Vanessa Walsh.

Publication history
The first Turtle appears in All Flash #21 and was created by Gardner Fox and Martin Naydel.

The second Turtle (the Turtle Man) appears in Showcase #4 and was created by Robert Kanigher and Carmine Infantino.

Fictional character biography

Turtle (Golden Age)
The original Turtle is a 1940s villain who uses tricks of slowness in battle with the Golden Age Flash (Jay Garrick). His main weapon is slow, deliberate planning. After a few clashes with the Flash, the Turtle fades from the public scene.

Years later, the Turtle Man carries on his legacy. After the debut of the third Flash (Wally West) in recent years, the original Turtle returns, now with the younger Turtle Man as his henchman, to take over Keystone City from underground. A final clash with Wally and his allies results in the Turtle destroying his own headquarters and apparently himself with it.

Turtle Man (Silver Age)
The Turtle Man (sometimes simply calling himself "the Turtle") is the first gimmicked Rogue fought by the second Flash (Barry Allen) and appears in Central City shortly after Barry's debut as the Flash. Originally using his natural slowness as a weapon, such as returning to rob a bank vault later to place people off guard, this Turtle Man is also an independently wealthy scientific genius who creates fantastic devices based on slowness. After robbing the bank he paints his shadow on the wall, fooling the Flash into crashing into it. In his first appearance, he is captured by the Flash while trying to escape via boat and arrested. This is apparently true both Pre- and Post-Crisis. The Turtle Man only has a handful of battles with the second Flash. After some years, the original Turtle from the 1940s returns and meets his "successor". Impressed with the latter's scientific talent, the first Turtle becomes an ally in an attempt to take over Keystone City. A lab accident seriously cripples the Turtle Man during this time. After the third Flash (Wally West) and his allies find the Turtle's underground headquarters, the original Turtle seemingly kills himself while the younger Turtle Man is taken into custody.

Later, the Turtle Man reappears again, seemingly cured from his severe injuries and having developed the ability to 'steal' speed, slowing down others around him to a crawl no matter how fast they were moving.

During the Infinite Crisis, the Turtle Man is part of the Secret Society of Super Villains led by Alexander Luthor Jr. (posing as Lex Luthor), using his speed-stealing abilities to negate the power of speedsters and thus make it harder for the heroes to track the Society.

Still Force entity
In Scott Snyder's Justice League series, the Turtle is revised as believing in an opposing energy to the Speed Force, known as the "Still Force". Each time he accessed this power, it aged him. Now a hatchling (described as "the fourth generation of his line"), he is finally attuned to the Still Force, and grants Gorilla Grodd (now a member of Lex Luthor's Legion of Doom) total control of it to combat the Flash. His origin was elaborated on with growing up in an abusive household, but this didn't stop his intellect from shining. The boy graduated from school far earlier then any of his classmates and quickly became a leading scientist. One day he met a woman and fell in love. The boy married this woman and had two children: a boy and a girl. The scientist spent most of his time with his family, slowing down his scientific advancements and allowing his peers to surpass him.

Growing jealous of his peers, the scientist began experimenting with a mysterious energy force that he believed kept the universe moving forward. In his jealousy, the scientist rushed the experiments, hoping to prove his genius again. His experiment quickly meandered out of control and the scientist was caught in an explosion. The explosion accelerated the scientist's age, giving him the body of a feeble old man. Furthermore his movement was slowed and he stopped aging physically or mentally. His family helped him through the recovery process and soon enough he could once again move like his old self, however he still kept the appearance of an old man.

He experimented with this energy force for decades, discovering he could negate any form of motion, including the progression of life. Eventually he became disillusioned with human life as he knew that he would outlive everyone he loved, this led him to kill his family with his powers as he saw them as a needless distraction from his work. Eventually he began going by the name "Turtle", most likely because of the motion negating powers he now possessed.

Jai West
In the pages of Flash Forward, Jai West is a manifestation of Wally West's fear of not being able to see his family again that was born in the Dark Multiverse. He is the twin brother of Irey West and was emigrated to Earth 0 by Wally.

In the Watchmen sequel Doomsday Clock, Doctor Manhattan's vision of a possible future says that Jai will become a superhero called the Turtle.

Powers and abilities
The Turtle Man wears a device that enables him to project a force field which can stop bullets. His shell is also body armor which can expand to cover his head and also has some jets in it. The Turtle Man also has a ray device that he uses to make people move slower, as well as a laser gun that causes the optic nerves of a person to see everything moving faster than they are.

Other characters named the Turtle
There have been other villains who called themselves the Turtle:
 The Turtle is a gangster who fought Robotman.
 The Turtle is a criminal who faced off against the Green Arrow and Speedy. He is a channel pirate who operates out of a glass structure and uses a submarine and his gang to commit crimes.

In other media
 The Turtle makes a cameo appearance in the Justice League Unlimited episode "Flash and Substance".
 Two incarnations of the Turtle appear in The Flash:
 The first Turtle appears in the second season episode "Potential Energy", portrayed by Aaron Douglas. This version is a metahuman thief named Russell Glosson who can drain the potential kinetic energy from his immediate surroundings and all those around him, sapping their speed. He is eventually apprehended by the Flash and imprisoned at S.T.A.R. Labs, where he is secretly killed by Harry Wells, who uses his brain tissue to create a device to siphon the Flash's speed on Zoom's orders.
 A female incarnation of the Turtle appears in the sixth season episode "Death of the Speed Force", portrayed by Vanessa Walsh. This version is Frida Novikov, a Russian metahuman criminal with chronokinetic abilities, which manifests as "time bubbles". While attempting to seek revenge on everyone who ruined a previous crime spree she went on, she is confronted by Joe West, the Flash, and Kid Flash. Together, the speedsters distract her long enough to negate her powers with the Velocity-X formula so West can arrest her.

References

External links
 
 
 Turtle and Turtle Man at Comic Vine
 Hyperborea entry for the Turtle

DC Comics metahumans
DC Comics supervillains
DC Comics male supervillains
Golden Age supervillains
Comics characters introduced in 1945
Characters created by Gardner Fox
Fictional turtles
Flash (comics) characters